Seward is an unincorporated community and census-designated place (CDP) in Logan County, Oklahoma, United States. Seward had a post office from May 15, 1889, to July 11, 1969. The community is named after William H. Seward.

The transmitter for KOSU (91.7 Mhz. FM) is located about 3 miles west of Seward.

Demographics

References

Unincorporated communities in Logan County, Oklahoma
Unincorporated communities in Oklahoma
Census-designated places in Logan County, Oklahoma
Census-designated places in Oklahoma